Rebecca Quinn may refer to:

Rebecca Quinn (cyclist) (born 1971), American cyclist
Quinn (soccer) (born 1995), Canadian soccer player

See also
Rebecca Quin (born 1987), Irish professional wrestler better known by her ring name Becky Lynch.